Kiltealy is a small village in the southeastern corner of Ireland. It is situated on the foothills of the Blackstairs Mountains in County Wexford at the junction of the R702 and R730 regional roads, on the eastern flank of the Blackstairs Mountains.

Demographics
In 2002, the Kiltealy electoral area had a population of 409.

People
Anthony Kearns, member of the Irish Tenors, born Kiltealy
Mogue Kearns, priest and executed rebel leader in the 1798 rebellion, born Kiltealy

See also
 List of towns and villages in Ireland

References

Towns and villages in County Wexford
Articles on towns and villages in Ireland possibly missing Irish place names